Popcorn and Ice Cream (German: Popcorn und Himbeereis) is a 1978 West German sex comedy film directed by Franz Josef Gottlieb and starring , Olivia Pascal and Zachi Noy.

Cast
  as Bobby Hansen
 Olivia Pascal as Vivi Berger 
 Zachi Noy as Jonny 
 Gesa Thoma as Bea 
 Alexander Grill as Hotelchef Alexander 
 Bea Fiedler as Policewoman Sandra 
 Karl Heinz Maslo as Bob Fischer 
 Margarethe Kuske as Hotelchefin 
 Walter Kraus as Otto Bronzky 
 Ursula Buchfellner as Yvonne 
 Erwin Neuwirth as Falschparker 
 Christine Zierl as Pamela 
 Rosl Mayr as Old Woman 
 Hermann Killmeyer as Koch 
 Otto Prem as Grobian 
 Herbert Fux as Priest

References

Bibliography
 Annette Miersch. Schulmädchen-Report: der deutsche Sexfilm der 70er Jahre. Bertz, 2003.

External links 
 

1978 films
1970s sex comedy films
West German films
1970s German-language films
Films directed by Franz Josef Gottlieb
Films scored by Gerhard Heinz
German sex comedy films
1978 comedy films
1970s German films